Thomas Boggs (1944–2008) was an American musician.

Thomas Boggs may also refer to:

Thomas Hale Boggs Sr. or Hale Boggs (1914-disappeared 1972), American politician from Louisiana and majority leader of the U.S. House of Representatives
Thomas Hale Boggs Jr. (1940–2014), American lawyer and lobbyist, son of Hale Boggs
Tom Boggs (poet) (1905–1952), American poet, editor, and novelist
Tommy Boggs (1955–2022), American baseball player